is a Japanese online novel by Natural-Rain. It was originally posted online in 2004, and was published in June 2012 by East Press. An anime television series adaptation by Drop aired from July 12 to September 27, 2017. The series is entirely directed and animated by Naoya Ishikawa.

Characters

Media

Anime
An anime television series adaptation by Drop aired from July 12 to September 27, 2017. The series is entirely directed and animated by Naoya Ishikawa. It was streamed exclusively on Amazon Prime Video.

Notes

References

External links
 

2017 anime television series debuts
2012 Japanese novels
Anime and manga based on novels